Alfredo Andrés Calderón Rosales (born 24 February 1986) is a Chilean former professional footballer who played as a striker for clubs in Chile and Argentina.

Club career
As a child, Calderón was with Villa Independencia and Club Miraflores in his hometown. Then he joined Coquimbo Unido youth system. A young player yet, he scored a goal versus Everton in the 2005 Torneo Apertura of the Primera División, becoming an important piece in the championship, where his club was the runner-up. He also is well remembered by the club fans after scored a goal versus Deportes La Serena, the traditional rival, in a 2–2 draw what was played in two parts due to incidents from both clubs fans. In 2007, he played on loan at Deportes Ovalle and was chose as the best player of the Tercera División.

In 2009, he joined Santiago Wanderers in the Primera B, getting promotion to Primera División after the club was the runner-up of the 2009 Primera B. In 2012 he played for San Luis de Quillota and Lota Schwager in the Primera B. For Lota Schwager, he just scored one goal versus Coquimbo Unido in the last matchday of the 2012 Clausura, where his club could stay at the category.

In 2013 he played for Racing de Olavarría in Argentina, what was coached by Víctor Comisso, a former coach of Coquimbo Unido in 2008.

He left the football activity during 2014. After playing for Deportes Valdivia in 2015, he left the football activity again until October 2016, when he signed with Lota Schwager in the Segunda División Profesional, scoring eight times. In June 2017 he tried to sign with Coquimbo Unido, but the coach Patricio Graff rejected him. So he joined Deportes Pintana, his last club.

After his retirement, he made his home in Coquimbo and has played for amateur clubs.

Personal life

Honours
 Tercera División de Chile Best Player: 2007

References

External links
 
 
 Alfredo Calderón at PlaymakerStats

1986 births
Living people
People from Marga Marga Province
Chilean footballers
Chilean expatriate footballers
Coquimbo Unido footballers
Deportes Ovalle footballers
Santiago Wanderers footballers
San Luis de Quillota footballers
Lota Schwager footballers
Racing de Olavarría footballers
Deportes Valdivia footballers
Municipal La Pintana footballers
Chilean Primera División players
Tercera División de Chile players
Primera B de Chile players
Torneo Argentino A players
Segunda División Profesional de Chile players
Chilean expatriate sportspeople in Argentina
Expatriate footballers in Argentina
Association football forwards